European management is defined as "cross-cultural, societal management based on an interdisciplinary approach" and has three characteristics:

 A European management approach needs to take into account the various cultures across Europe and how they impact business practice, to pinpoint cultural commonalities and particularities in different organizational environments and management habits. 
 Management principles across Europe have underpinnings which are strongly societal in nature.
 European managers are required to be highly adaptable due to several different legal, social, political, and economic contexts across Europe. Such adaptability is coupled with the ability to adopt an interdisciplinary approach.

Often European management is contrasted to the American or Japanese management culture. While Americans pursue risk more easily, Europeans rather pursue stability leading to less opportunities with fewer financial rewards. The European approach often is considered to be more balanced between economic efficiency and social concerns.

Further reading 
 Calori Roland, De Woot Philippe (1995) A European Management Model: Beyond Diversity: Unity in Diversity. Prentice-Hall.
 Dickmann Michael, Sparrow Paul (2008) International Human Resource Management: A European Perspective. Routledge.
 Kaplan Andreas (2015) European business and management. Sage Publications Ltd., London.
 Kaplan Andreas (2018) Towards a theory of European business culture: The case of management education at the ESCP Europe Business School, The Routledge Companion to European Business, 113-124.
 Thurley Keith, Wirdenius Hans (1989) Towards European Management, FT Prentice Hall.

References

Management by type
European society